Derek West may refer to:

 Derek West (American football) (born 1972), American football tackle
 Derek West (baseball) (born 1996), American baseball player
 G. Derek West (1922–2002), British academic
 Tony West (attorney) (Derek Anthony West, born 1965), American lawyer